The 1936 Tour de Suisse was the fourth edition of the Tour de Suisse cycle race and was held from 20 June to 27 June 1936. The race started and finished in Zürich. The race was won by Henri Garnier of the Belgian team.

General classification

References

1936
Tour de Suisse